Köhnə Xaçmaz (also, Kohna Khachmaz) is a village and municipality in the Khachmaz District of Azerbaijan. It has a population of 3,358.

References 

Populated places in Khachmaz District